Chasing Dreams is the debut studio album by English singer, comedian, television presenter and actor Bradley Walsh. The album was released on 25 November 2016 through Decca Records. It peaked at number 10 on the UK Albums Chart and has been certified Gold by the British Phonographic Industry (BPI) for sales of 100,000 copies in the UK. Chasing Dreams was the biggest selling debut album by a British artist in 2016, outselling albums by the likes of Zayn Malik, Blossoms and Jack Garratt.

Track listing

Charts and certifications

Weekly charts

Year-end charts

Certifications

References

2016 debut albums
Bradley Walsh